The mallemin (also maalemine, muallemin etc.; derived from a plural of the Arabic word mu`allim, meaning approximately "sir" or "teacher") were a professional caste of blacksmiths and metalworkers within Hassaniya Arab society, Mauritania, southern Morocco and Western Sahara and . They held a low place on the social ladder, but their services were used by all tribes.

See also 

Tribal castes and terms:
 Hassane (warrior tribes)
 Zaouiya (religious tribes)
 Znaga (subservient tribes)
 Haratine (former slaves, freedmen)
 Abid (slaves)
 Igaouen (griot bards)

Other:
 Mauritania
 Western Sahara
 Hassaniya Arabic
 Arab
 Berber people

Further reading 

 John Mercer (1976), Spanish Sahara, George Allen & Unwid Ltd
 Anthony G. Pazzanita (2006), Historical Dictionary of Western Sahara, Scarecrow Press
 Virginia Thompson and Richard Adloff (1980), The Western Saharans. Background to Conflict, Barnes & Noble Books

Society of the Sahrawi Arab Democratic Republic
Society of Mauritania
Sahrawi tribes